Clementina "Kit" Caroline Anstruther-Thomson (1857–1921) was a Scottish author and art theorist. She was known for writing and lecturing on experimental aesthetics during the Victorian era. Her collaboration with Vernon Lee in the 1890s inspired Lee's growing interests in the psychological aspect of aesthetics later in her career.

Early life 

Anstruther-Thomson was born to John Anstruther-Thomson of Charleton and Carntyne, and Caroline Maria Agnes Robina Gray in an aristocratic family. Her grandfather, also John Anstruther-Thomson, was a career officer in the British Territorial Army.

Experimental aesthetics 

The aesthetic movement in the United Kingdom began in the 1860s during the Victorian period. In Victorian literature, writers of the aesthetic movement focused on the sensual aspect of aesthetics. Anstruther-Thomson in particular was keen on experiencing art physically with her body.  In one of the lectures titled "What Patterns Do to Us" given by Anstruther-Thomson, she encouraged the audience to engage with a patterned vase and "feel its effect on their bodies".

Vernon Lee was already familiar with Anstruther-Thomson's work prior to meeting her. Contemporary writers have described Anstruther-Thomson as having the physique that resembles the ideals from ancient Greek sculpture, and Lee frequently described her obsession with Anstruther-Thomson's body in her writings. When Lee observed art with Anstruther-Thomson, her aesthetic experience was based on "lesbian desire" of Anstruther-Thomson's body that embodied Greek ideals.

Collaboration with Vernon Lee 

Anstruther-Thomson first met Vernon Lee in 1888, and for the next twelve years the two women openly lived together, as "lovers, friends, and co-authors". Living as expatriates in Italy, they often travelled back and forth to Britain. In their time together, they took aesthetics experiments and recorded their findings. Throughout the 1890s, Anstruther-Thomson and Lee visited many museums across continental Europe and observed many art works. In their observation, they recorded in writing on how their body responded to art works.

In 1897, they published the combined findings in the article "Beauty and Ugliness", which investigates the physiology of aesthetics. Their research was based on the James–Lange theory of how the human body responds to stimulation and triggers emotion. Many of the findings, however, were not taken seriously as both their professional and romantic relationship was "attacked" by their contemporaries, receiving "severe criticisms" from friends.

Later life 

After the publication of "Beauty and Ugliness", Anstruther-Thomson gradually drifted away from Lee, and eventually broke off the relationship in 1898., remaining close friends. She was subsequently in a relationship with the Welsh author and Chief Commissioner for Girl Guides in Wales, Hon. Fflorens Roch (1879-1969), the two were "rarely apart".

Later in her life, Anstruther-Thomson worked closely with the Girl Guides Association. Many of the leaders were single women, and some were lesbian as well, for whom Guiding provided a safe refuge. Anstruther-Thomson was both an organiser and trainer, and held the position of County Commissioner until her death. She was buried with her family in Kilconquhar Parish Churchyard, Kilconquhar.

Her writings on aesthetics were collected and published posthumously by Lee in Art and Man in 1924, with an introduction, also by Lee, that describes their collaboration in experiencing art.

Personal views 
Anstruther-Thompson was a humanist and a proponent of the British Ethical movement. She was a paid-up member of the West London Ethical Society, a predecessor group of Humanists UK, which later recalled her contributions as one of its "heroines of freethought".

References

Citations

Bibliography 

Scottish lesbian writers
Scottish women writers
Victorian women writers
Victorian writers
British ethicists
1857 births
1921 deaths
Clementina
Scottish art critics
Scottish women critics
Scottish humanists
Scottish atheists
Scottish expatriates in Italy